Edward C. Gayda (May 11, 1927 – December 11, 2021) was an American professional basketball player. Gayda was selected in the second round (15th pick overall) of the 1950 NBA draft by the Tri-Cities Blackhawks after a collegiate career at Washington State. He played for the Blackhawks in 15 total games in 1951–52.  In 2014, he was inducted into the Pac-12 Hall of Honor.

Following his playing career, Gayda went into private business. He died on December 11, 2021.

References

1927 births
2021 deaths
American men's basketball players
Basketball players from Washington (state)
Forwards (basketball)
Guards (basketball)
Tri-Cities Blackhawks draft picks
Tri-Cities Blackhawks players
Washington State Cougars men's basketball players